Pushover  is a 1954 American film noir crime film directed by Richard Quine and starring Fred MacMurray, Phil Carey and Kim Novak in her first credited role. The motion picture was adapted from two novels, Thomas Walsh's The Night Watch and William S. Ballinger's Rafferty, by Roy Huggins, who went on to great success creating television series, including The Fugitive, Maverick, and The Rockford Files.

Plot

During a bank robbery a bank guard, in attempting to wrest a pistol from one of the two robbers, is shot and killed by the robber, Harry Wheeler (Paul Richards).

Lona McLane (Kim Novak), an unaccompanied young woman in a mink coat, leaves a movie theatre and walks to her car. When she tries to start it, it will not turn over, but almost immediately Paul Sheridan (Fred MacMurray) appears at her window to offer his assistance. He spends the evening with her as they call a mechanic, stop for a drink at a bar, and repair to his apartment.

In the morning, Sheridan appears at his office, a police precinct, where we discover he is a cop who has been dispatched to see what he can find out from Miss McLane, the erstwhile girlfriend of Harry Wheeler, who has now been identified as the principal bank robber.  Sheridan is presented as an honest cop who, along with his partner Rick McAllister (Phillip Carey) and a number of his other associates, has been tasked by his boss, Police Lieutenant Karl Eckstrom (E.G. Marshall), to recover the stolen $250,000 and to capture Wheeler alive so the police will be able to find out from him who his accomplice is. Among Sheridan's other associates is Paddy Dolan (Allen Nourse), who has a drinking problem but is well-liked and nearing retirement. As such he is in danger of losing his pension if he screws up again, and Lt. Eckstrom has asked Sheridan to watch out for him so that he does not screw up.  He and other officers maintain 24-hour surveillance on Lona McLane in her apartment from a stakeout apartment they rent, conveniently, across the courtyard and from the driver's seat of a car parked outside the apartment building.

Sheridan is falling for Lona, who has now figured out that he is a cop, as the mechanic fixing her car, tells her it was tampered with. She is at first furious, but quickly melts in Sheridan's arms, professing her love for him. She then tries to persuade him to kill Wheeler so the two can take off with the loot. At first he seems insulted and angrily resists—he has been an honest cop— but also because he now believes he is the one being used. He orders her to leave his apartment where they have met for an assignation.

Sheridan then is shown to brood, in hallways and in his apartment stakeout, smoking cigarette after cigarette, as he mulls over the proposition Lona has made him. Eventually, he caves and they meet on the roof of the apartment building where he agrees to mastermind Wheeler's murder and the theft of the bank's money.

Meanwhile, Sheridan's associate, Rick McAllister, has been watching through his binoculars not only Lona in her apartment but also a woman in the apartment next door, who turns out to be a nurse, Ann Stewart (Dorothy Malone). Rick has become fascinated and infatuated with her as she bustles about her apartment hanging drapes and doing calisthenics. He later saves her from an unwanted advance, and she becomes interested in him.

As Sheridan's plot unfolds, things go awry. He is unable to find Lona when he goes into her apartment to look for her. Miss Stewart, who is having a party next door, goes to Lona's apartment to ask to borrow some ice. As she is about to knock, Sheridan opens the door to leave, and encounters her. He rudely refuses her request and quickly closes the door.

As planned, Wheeler shows up, betrayed by Lona, and is nabbed by Sheridan. Because Paddy was not at his post as he should have been, Sheridan, who has agreed to hide Paddy's dereliction of duty, now has Paddy in tow. Sheridan and Paddy force Wheeler to take them to Wheeler's car where he has stowed the bag of money in the trunk. As Paddy leans in the trunk to inspect the bag, Sheridan pushes Wheeler onto Paddy and shoots Wheeler dead, claiming to Paddy that he had no choice since Wheeler had jumped Paddy and swift action was necessary.

Meanwhile, Rick has spoken to Miss Stewart, who has told him about the man she saw in Lona's apartment. Rick believes this man to be Wheeler, and tells her to call the police if she sees the man again.

Paddy figures out that Sheridan is not protecting him just because he wants to save his pension but because he wants the $250,000. Paddy, though a screw-up, is an honest man and vows to tell the lieutenant what has transpired. This means Sheridan would not get the money. When Sheridan moves across the front seat to prevent Paddy from opening the car door, Paddy pulls his pistol. There is a struggle and Paddy is shot in the stomach and killed with his own gun.

Not long thereafter Miss Stewart, taking out the garbage, has another chance encounter in the hall with Sheridan, whom she recognizes as having been in Lona's apartment. She goes back to her apartment to call the police. Sheridan, watching from the stakeout apartment, enters her apartment and forces her and Lona, who has now returned, to accompany him to Wheeler's car where he believes the money is still located.

They walk to an alley across from where the car is parked, but a police car is parked behind it. He tells Miss Stewart to cross the street to retrieve the money from the trunk of the car. As she reaches the car, Rick, who has reached the police car unseen by Sheridan, tells her to get down when he fires his gun. He shoots towards the alleyway where Sheridan and Lona are standing. Sheridan tells Lona to leave, and runs out to Wheeler's car, in a misguided attempt to flee the scene. A detective fatally shoots Sheridan. More police arrive as Lona walks towards the dying Sheridan, and she is gently guided to the back of the police car. Rick takes Miss Stewart's arm to walk her home, and they walk away together into the night.

Cast
Character names are not indicated in on-screen cast credits

Production
The film was known during shooting as The Killer Wore a Badge. It was developed by producer Philip Waxman who was going to make the movie, based on a Saturday Evening Post serial by Thomas Walsh and adapted into a script by Orin Jennings and Stanley Ellin. Waxman sold the script to Columbia, and the studio assigned Jules Shermer as producer.
 

At Columbia the script was done by Roy Huggins. Producer Schermer later recalled Huggins:
 Did not give me exactly what I wanted and I didn’t like the ending. So I took some things from a previous film that I had done on the lot (Framed with Glenn Ford and Janis Carter) and borrowed from that. If you ever watch the film, you will see that much of it is the same — even to the ending — with the same dialogue which also worked for Pushover. When Huggins eventually saw a rough cut of the latter he said, "You’ve ruined my picture” — because of what I had borrowed from Framed. Fortunately, nobody else thought so.

In November 1953 it was announced Arnold Laven would direct.

Fred MacMurray's fee was $75,000. The budget was relatively low meaning the studio had to cast an inexpensive actor as the female lead. The role was given to Kim Novak. Schermer said "Kim was not an actress when we started shooting. The face was beautiful. The body was great. She photographed sensationally. But she couldn’t show any emotion. So we kept her dialogue to a minimum. When you can’t act, you react — which is what we counted on."

The outdoor scenes were filmed on the streets of Burbank, California. Prominent is the old Magnolia Theater on Magnolia Street.

Reception

Most critics seemed to find the film's plot similar to other films noir, with some specifically comparing it to Double Indemnity (1944). The  reviewer for The New York Times commented: "Fred MacMurray is going through the motions of his Double Indemnity role in a mild facsimile."
However, Kim Novak is usually singled out as a rising photogenic star. Much later, Chicago Reader film critic Jonathan Rosenbaum wrote, "An aging cop (Fred MacMurray) falls in love with a bank robber's girlfriend (Kim Novak in her first major role, and if you're as much of a pushover for her early work as I am, you can't afford to miss this)."

Film critic Craig Butler wrote, "Aficionados will doubtlessly argue whether The Pushover should be classified as film noir or merely as a suspense film, but whichever its category, this overlooked movie deserves to be better known. Not that it's a great film, for it's not—the characters don't develop fully enough, remaining just film types rather than flesh and blood people, the themes of the film are not explored deeply enough to have resonance, and there's a late development that asks the audience to change its mind about the leading lady that just doesn't work. Still, it's immensely entertaining, skillfully directed by Richard Quine with the requisite suspense trappings (and a wonderfully unsettling sense of voyeurism), and covering a lot of territory in its 88 minutes."

Critic Dennis Schwartz liked the film and wrote, "Pushover covers familiar film noir territory, but does a good job of showing how easy it is to lose control of one's life when one is so vulnerable, obsessed and emotionally weak. Novak does a fine job in her first starring role as a heartless femme fatale who does have a heart after all."

Legacy
Pushover inspired Jean-Luc Godards Breathless.

References

External links
 
 
 
 
Pressbook at Internet Archive

1954 films
1954 crime films
American black-and-white films
American crime films
Columbia Pictures films
1950s English-language films
Film noir
Films based on American novels
Films directed by Richard Quine
1950s American films